Copelatus fossilis is a species of diving beetle. It is part of the genus Copelatus of the subfamily Copelatinae in the family Dytiscidae. It was described by Riha in 1974.

References

fossilis
Beetles described in 1974